Veljanovski is a Macedonian surname. Notable people with the surname include:

Aleksandar Veljanovski (footballer born 1984) (born 1984), Swiss footballer
Trajko Veljanovski (born 1962), Macedonian politician

Macedonian-language surnames